Hannah Pickett Mill No. 1 was a historic textile mill complex located at Rockingham, Richmond County, North Carolina.  The complex consisted of a large two story main building with Italianate style tower built between 1906 and 1908, and two large attached weave rooms, two adjacent cotton warehouses, and a small brick veneered office building dating from the early 1920s.  The Hannah Pickett Mill administrative offices were housed in the Manufacturers Building.  It has been demolished.

It was listed on the National Register of Historic Places in 1983.

References

Industrial buildings and structures on the National Register of Historic Places in North Carolina
Italianate architecture in North Carolina
Industrial buildings completed in 1906
Buildings and structures in Randolph County, North Carolina
National Register of Historic Places in Richmond County, North Carolina
1906 establishments in North Carolina